Fernando Emmanuel De la Fuente (born 26 March 1986) is an Argentine footballer. He primarily plays as a defensive midfielder, but can also operates into the central zone or as a Box-to-box.

Career
De la Fuente began his career at Racing Club, being promoted by coach Diego Simeone after plays youth spells at hometown Patagones. In 2011, Feña joined Primera División club O'Higgins in Chile where had a breakout season that allowed him move to Chilean giant Colo-Colo, after a prior spell at Deportes La Serena.

De la Fuente joined Club Cipolletti in July 2018, but left the club again at the end of the 2018.

References

External links
 Fernando De la Fuente at Football-Lineups
 
 Argentine Primera statistics at Fútbol XXI 
 

1986 births
Living people
People from Sierra Grande, Río Negro
Argentine footballers
Argentine expatriate footballers
Racing Club de Avellaneda footballers
San Martín de San Juan footballers
Unión de Santa Fe footballers
Atlético de Rafaela footballers
Chacarita Juniors footballers
Deportes La Serena footballers
O'Higgins F.C. footballers
Colo-Colo footballers
Instituto footballers
Quilmes Atlético Club footballers
Santiago Wanderers footballers
Nueva Chicago footballers
Argentine Primera División players
Chilean Primera División players
Expatriate footballers in Chile
Association football midfielders